Open Road is a 2019 studio album by The Rippingtons.

Track listing
As stated on the cover, all songs predominantly feature Russ Freeman.

Personnel 
 Russ Freeman – keyboards, guitars, pedal steel guitar, bass, rhythm programming 
 Bill Heller – keyboards
 Rico Belled – bass
 Dave Karasony – drums 
 Brandon Fields – saxophones

References

The Rippingtons albums
2019 albums